Adi Koll (born 19 March 1976) is an Israeli social activist and former politician. She served as a member of the Knesset for Yesh Atid between 2013 and 2015.

Biography
Koll studied for a bachelor's degree in law at the Hebrew University of Jerusalem, where she established a careers centre. She later obtained an LLM and a JSD in law at Columbia University. In 2005 she started working as a lecturer at Tel Aviv University, and was also a member of the faculty at Ben-Gurion University of the Negev from 2009 until 2013. She founded the University of the People, which provides free university courses taught by students at Tel Aviv University.

She joined the new Yesh Atid party in 2012 and was placed ninth on the party's list for the 2013 Knesset elections. She entered the Knesset after the party won 19 seats. In December 2014 she announced that she would not stand in the 2015 elections, and would return to the education field.

Koll lives in Tel Aviv.

References

External links

1976 births
Israeli Jews
Academic staff of Ben-Gurion University of the Negev
Columbia Law School alumni
Hebrew University of Jerusalem Faculty of Law alumni
Israeli activists
Israeli women activists
Living people
Women members of the Knesset
Members of the 19th Knesset (2013–2015)
People from Jerusalem
Academic staff of Tel Aviv University
Yesh Atid politicians
People from Tel Aviv